Hathaway Pines is an unincorporated community in Calaveras County, California, 8 km (5 mi) south of Arnold and 20 km (12.5 mi) northeast of Angels Camp. It lies at an elevation of 3323 feet (1013 m). Hathaway Pines' post office was established in 1943; it has the zip code 95233.

The place's name honors Robert B. Hathaway, a vacation resort promoter who became the first postmaster.

Climate
This region experiences warm (but not hot) and dry summers, with no average monthly temperatures above 71.6 °F.  According to the Köppen Climate Classification system, Hathaway Pines has a warm-summer Mediterranean climate, abbreviated "Csb" on climate maps.

References

External links

Unincorporated communities in California
Unincorporated communities in Calaveras County, California